Łoś (Polish) or Los (Czech, Slovak, Slovenian, etc., also transliterated from Belarusian, Ukrainian, and Russian "Лось") is a surname meaning "moose" or "elk" in most Slavic languages.

People
 Jan Łoś (born 2000), Polish footballer
 Jerzy Łoś (1920–1998), Polish mathematician and logician
 Ludwik Łoś (1914–1995), Polish footballer
 Urszula Łoś (born 1994), Polish racing cyclist

Fictional characters
Comrade Los, a character from the novel and film Alitet Leaves for the Hills
Engineer  Mstislav Sergeyevich Los, a character from the Russian science fiction novel Aelita and film with the same name

See also
 
 

Polish-language surnames
Czech-language surnames
Slovak-language surnames
Ukrainian-language surnames